John Joseph "Jocko" Fields (October 20, 1864 – October 14, 1950) was a Major League Baseball player. He was born on October 20, 1864, in Cork, Ireland. Fields made his Major League debut on May 31, 1887. He played for the Pittsburgh Pirates, Pittsburgh Burghers, Philadelphia Phillies and New York Giants. Fields played 341 games in the majors, with 358 hits in 1,319 at bats. He had a lifetime average of .271. He had 12 home runs and 176 RBI. Fields died on October 14, 1950, in Jersey City, New Jersey.

References

External links

1864 births
1950 deaths
19th-century baseball players
Major League Baseball outfielders
Major League Baseball catchers
Pittsburgh Alleghenys players
Pittsburgh Pirates players
Pittsburgh Burghers players
Philadelphia Phillies players
New York Giants (NL) players
Major League Baseball players from Ireland
Irish baseball players
Sportspeople from Cork (city)
Jersey City Skeeters players
Utica Pent Ups players
Buffalo Bisons (minor league) players
Long Island A's players
Omaha Lambs players
Macon Central City players
Macon Hornets players
Harrisburg Senators players
Charleston Seagulls players
Milwaukee Brewers (minor league) players
Evansville Black Birds players
Atlanta Crackers players
Norfolk Braves players
Somerville West Ends players
Irish emigrants to the United States (before 1923)